The Anglo Irish Bank Corporation Act 2009 is a piece of emergency legislation composed by the Irish government in January 2009. The Act provides for the emergency nationalisation of Anglo Irish Bank which had been subject to a controversy regarding hidden loans in December 2008. It was approved in the Dáil by a vote of 79 to 67, before passing in the Seanad without a vote on 20 January 2009. It was then signed by President Mary McAleese on 21 January 2009. The bank's shares had decreased dramatically on the stock exchange in previous days. At the time of its nationalisation, Anglo Irish Bank had 7,000 loan customers, of whom 5,000 were Irish.

Background

Oireachtas debates
The bill passed through the Oireachtas on 20–21 January 2009.

Dáil debate
The debate in Dáil Éireann lasted five hours and the bill was passed by 79 to 67. Opposition parties Fine Gael and Labour both voted against the legislation, citing a lack of clarity in the Government's proposals. Labour TD Pat Rabbitte regretted that the Dáil did not have the time to debate the matter properly, whilst the party's financial spokesman Joan Burton said there was a failure on the part of the Government to provide any relevant information about the financial situation of the bank. Minister for Finance Brian Lenihan said during the debate that Ireland's two other main banks, Allied Irish Banks (AIB) and Bank of Ireland, would not be nationalised despite they too enduring major falls in their share prices. He said the Government would instead stand by to inject up to €2 billion of public money into AIB and Bank of Ireland.

Seanad debate
The bill passed through Seanad Éireann without a vote; however there was a debate on the matter. During the Seanad's debate on the bill, Senator Shane Ross claimed that "no-one was being told the truth about Anglo Irish Bank" and called an Emergency General Meeting of shareholders which had taken place the previous Friday "a disgrace, show[ing] corporate Ireland at its worst, as there were no answers to any questions". Independent Senator Joe O'Toole advocated the chasing of those responsible for the bank's nationalisation "even into the courts", saying that a person could be imprisoned for failure to pay a household bill, yet those who caused the loss of jobs and pensions might not.

References

External links
 Anglo Irish Bank Corporation Bill from the Government of Ireland

2009 in Irish politics
Post-2008 Irish economic downturn
2009 in Irish law
Acts of the Oireachtas of the 2000s
Brian Cowen
Anglo Irish Bank